Andrew Nisbet Jr. (September 10, 1921 – February 24, 2013) was an American military officer and state legislator.

Born in Oakland, California, Nisbet went to Stanford University, University of Georgia, and Columbia University. In 1942 Nisbet enlisted in the United States Army and retired in 1975. Nisbet and his wife moved to Sequim, Washington. Nisbet served as port commissioner for Port Angeles, Washington. He also served in the Washington House of Representatives 1978-1982 as a Republican. Nisbet died in Leavenworth, Kansas.

Notes

1921 births
2013 deaths
Politicians from Oakland, California
People from Sequim, Washington
People from Leavenworth, Kansas
Stanford University alumni
University of Georgia alumni
Columbia University alumni
Republican Party members of the Washington House of Representatives
United States Army personnel of World War II